The Safra family is a prominent Brazilian-origin family of Syrian-Lebanese Jewish descent. The Safras were bankers and gold traders engaged in the financing of trade between Beirut, Aleppo, Istanbul and Alexandria.

Family tree

Jacob Safra (1891–1963), married to Esther Teira (1900–1943), 9 children
Elie Safra (1922–1993), married to Yvette Dabbah (1927–2006), 4 children
Jacqui Safra (1940–), partner of Jean Doumanian (1939–)
Diane Safra
Stela Safra
Patricia Safra
Paulette Safra (1923–1937)
Eveline Safra (1924–), married Rahmo Nasser (?—2003), 4 children
 
Edmond Safra (1932–1999), married Lily Watkins, no children
Arlette Safra (1933–), married David Hazan, 8 children
Moise Safra (1934–2014), married Chella Cohen, 5 children
Jacob Safra
Ezra Safra
Esther Safra, married to Claudio Szajman, son of  
Edmond Safra, married to Marielle Nahmad, daughter of David Nahmad and sister of Helly Nahmad and Joe Nahmad
Olga Safra
Hugette Safra (1936–), married Ralph Michaan, 6 children
Gaby Safra (1937–2022), married to her cousin Elliot Safra (1920–2003), 2 children 
Joseph Safra (1938–2020), married Vicky Sarfaty, 4 children
Alberto J. Safra (1979/1980–), married to Maggy Candi, 4 children
Jacob J. Safra
David J. Safra

References